David Eaton (born 28 September 1980) is a Welsh artistic gymnast who won a silver medal for Wales at the 2006 Commonwealth Games.

External links
 
 
 

1980 births
Living people
British male artistic gymnasts
Commonwealth Games silver medallists for Wales
Commonwealth Games medallists in gymnastics
Gymnasts at the 2006 Commonwealth Games
Medallists at the 2006 Commonwealth Games